Huntingtown High School is located at 4125 North Solomons Island Road, Huntingtown, Maryland (MD), United States. Completed and opened in 2004, HHS is currently home to approximately fifteen hundred students from grades 9 to 12. Huntingtown High School (HHS) is in Calvert County, and is part of the Calvert County Public Schools (CCPS).

Campus
The HHS campus features, aside from its building and traffic pattern: a football field, softball and baseball fields, a track, eight tennis courts and an assortment of practice fields and storm-water management ponds. The large, 3-story building is surrounded by these and two parking lots exiting onto Maryland Route 4. There is also a nature trail/cross country path which runs through the woods surrounding the building.

Academics
Huntingtown offers 21 Advanced Placement courses, as well as honors and standard classes.

Athletics
HHS hosts a variety of sports teams directed by VaShawne Gross. The Hurricanes compete in the Southern Maryland Athletic Conference (SMAC) and the 3A South Region of the Maryland Public Secondary Schools Athletic Association. Fall sports include football, boys' and girls' soccer, field hockey, cross country, golf, and volleyball. Winter sports include swimming, boys' and girls' basketball, indoor track, wrestling, and ice hockey. There are also cheer and dance teams for both the fall and winter. Spring sports include boys' and girls' lacrosse, softball, baseball, track and field, and tennis, and cheer.

Ice Hockey
Huntingtown established an ice hockey team in 2007.

Baseball
The Huntingtown baseball team is managed by Guy Smith Jr. Huntingtown has been to the State playoffs three times: in 2006, 2007, and 2010; they have reached the State finals three times: in 2006, 2010 and 2016. The Hurricanes have also been SMAC Champions five times: in 2007, 2009, 2010, 2011, and 2016. They won their first state title on May 30, 2016 defeating Chesapeake High School of Pasadena 4–3. This was also the first state champion won by a boys' team as well as the first baseball champion won by a high school in Calvert County. The team was led by future Major Leaguer, Alec "Hotstuff" Holtkamp.

Programs in the arts

Music
Huntingtown's Music Department is directed by Ms. Jessa Sablan (Band), Mrs. Sandra Griese (Chorus), and Mrs. Sara Moran (String Orchestra). The department sends several students yearly to Maryland All-State music programs, as well as various other honors ensembles.

Theatre
Huntingtown's Eye of the Storm Productions (EOTSP), under the direction of Mr. Derek Anderson, has been recognized by the American Alliance for High School Theatre as one of the top 35 High School Programs in the country. The company produces a fall play and spring musical, in addition to "Black Box" shows throughout the year.
The Eye of the Storms Productions is notable for producing famous musicals and plays, such as the successful The Phantom of the Opera and other musicals such as Footloose (musical). Along with musicals, EOTSP has produced plays such as A Midsummer Night's Dream. Huntingtown was one of the first high schools in the country to perform the musical In the Heights, which opened in the spring of 2013.

Journalism
The school's journalism program produces a news-magazine and yearbook annually.

Marching Band
The HHS Marching Hurricanes, directed by Ms. Jessa Sablan, is composed of students playing a wide range wind and percussion instruments as well as many Colorguard members. The Marching Hurricanes, composed of about 65 instrumentalists and guard members at the time.

Additional programs

Robotics
The HHS Robotics team was established in 2009, and has competed three times in local VEX Robotics Competitions.

Student Government Association
The HHS SGA is a member of the Calvert Association of Student Councils, the Maryland Association of Student Councils, and the National Association of Student Councils. It has won the MASC Felix Simon Award for outstanding SGA's and has hosted two state conferences. Every year, HHS SGA hosts homecoming along with other events, and sends multiple kids to both state and national conferences.

Humane Society Club
The Humane Society Club is for students interested in the protection of animals.

KEY Club
Key Club (Kiwanis Educating Youth) is a club devoted to giving back to the community and informing others of what they do as a club and a whole. They participate in numerous fundraising and awareness activities, such as: The Eliminate Project, Trick or Treat in the Garden at Anne Marie Gardens, The End Hunger Food Drive in Calvert County, and much more. The Huntingtown High School Key Club, while attending their District Convention in 2015, received numerous awards. These awards include: Outstanding President to Sydney President, Outstanding Vice President to Christy Nguyen, the Dale Q. Larson Faculty Outstanding Faculty Advisor to Ms. Rachel Dove, an Above and Outstanding Member Award to Elisabeth Cunningham, and First Place in the Club Video Contest.

Notable alumni 

 Trevon Jenifer, member of the USA National Wheelchair Basketball Team

See also
List of high schools in Maryland

References

External links
 Huntingtown High School Website
 The Hurricane Nation Online Newspaper

Public high schools in Maryland
Schools in Calvert County, Maryland
Educational institutions established in 2004
2004 establishments in Maryland